Herbie Rich (February 23, 1944 – May 12, 2004) was an American multi-instrumentalist from Omaha, Nebraska, who was a member of The New Breed, The Electric Flag, and the Buddy Miles Express. He also played with Jimi Hendrix, Mike Bloomfield and others.

Career
In the 1950s, Rich was a member of The 7-Wonders, a group that included his family members. Around 1964, he formed the Omaha group, The New Breed. Members included Stemsy Hunter, Hoshal Wright, Jerry Bennett, Hank Redd and Curly Martin and Jerry Bennett.

The Electric Flag
Mike Bloomfield once said of Herbie Rich that he plays keyboard like Jimi Hendrix plays guitar. Another member of The Flag, Peter Strazza referred to Rich as a monster, an unbelievable musician who could play any instrument.

Having been a member of The Electric Flag since joining in 1967, Rich had been with the band from its early days. Mike Bloomfield had added the baritone saxophonist in time for their show at the Monterey Pop Festival. Rich was part of the band's horn section that included Marcus Doubleday and Peter Strazza. Michael Fonfara had replaced the organist Barry Goldberg who had left in early December 1968. When Fonfara got Busted for drugs, Rich took over as the band's organist. He had a dual role, playing both saxophone and organ until Stemsy Hunter came on board in the beginning of 1968 Rich had really been brought into the band as a sax player and to increase the breadth or the horn section. Now playing organ, Bloomfield got to hear how good he really was. And he was very impressed. Rich had a liking for Jazz and a soulful sound which to a degree had an effect on where the band was heading.

An incident took place after the band did a one night show in Detroit. Peter Strazza had tried to make a drug deal in his room. This resulted in Rich and Stemsy Hunter being up and robbed by the drug dealers, who had also taken Strazza hostage. Unwise to what was taking place, Buddy Miles and Mike Bloomfield who were in another room, slept through the whole event. In addition to Rich and Hunter having their money stolen, the band's clothes were stolen, the dealers even stole Rich's wig.

By March 1968, the Flag had released A Long Time Comin'. In addition to both baritone and tenor sax, Rich had contributed some vocals and guitar to the album.

In late 1968, An American Music Band was released on Columbia CS 9714. Mike Bloomfield was not featured on the album as he had left in May 1968. Rich played an active part on the album. His organ solos can be heard on "Hey, Little Girl", and their rendition of Bobby Hebb's "Sunny" with Buddy Miles on vocals. Rich also did the sax solo and sang lead on a song called "Qualified". He also did the sax solo for " My Woman That Hangs Around The House" and did the horn arrangements for " Mystery".

The Buddy Miles Express
After the Electric Flag broke up, Buddy Miles formed The Buddy Miles Express. Rich was one of the four ex-Flag members of the group that joined Miles's new band.  In addition to Miles and Rich, the group included  his brother Billy Rich on bass, Jimmy McCarty on lead guitar, who was formerly with Mitch Ryder and the Detroit Wheels, Terence Clements on tenor sax, and  Virgil Gonsales on baritone sax.
Rich played organ on The Buddy Miles Express debut album, Expressway to your Skull which was released in 1968. He also played some sax and co-wrote two songs, "Spot On The Wall" and "Train". A short review on the album in the November, 30 issue of Billboard, singled out those two songs as the ones that would give the fuel for the album's quick rise to the charts etc. "Train" Part 1 bw "Train" Part 2 was released as a single on Mercury 72860.

Jimi Hendrix
On March 17, 1968, Rich got to play with Jimi Hendrix when Hendrix was invited to Jam with Butterfield on stage at the Café Au Go Go in New York. Rich was playing organ. Other musicians present were Harvey Brooks on bass, Phil Wilson and Buddy Miles on drums, and James Tatum on sax.
Rich would play with the Jimi Hendrix Experience. One live show was at Winterland in San Francisco on October 11, 1968. He joined the group on its cover of Bob Dylan's "Like a Rolling Stone". According to review Alan Bershaw, the presence of Rich sent Hendrix into new areas. Rich played on other songs like "Lover Man", Hey Joe", "Fire" and "Foxy Lady".  Carter Shelter of Paste in his May 15, 2017 article, noted his organ playing on "Fire" adding a new dynamic to the song.

Later years
Rich became involved in the ministry with his wife Hilda who he had married in 1989. They would take their message to places like large malls around Atlanta, to schools and nursing homes. They also visited homeless shelters and halfway houses.

Rich died in Mableton, Georgia on May 12, 2004, at the age of 60.

Selected discography

References

External links
 Nebraska Music Hall of Fame website: Herbie Rich

1944 births
2004 deaths
20th-century organists
21st-century organists
20th-century American saxophonists
21st-century American saxophonists
The Electric Flag members
Buddy Miles Express members
African-American saxophonists
American funk saxophonists
American male saxophonists
African American rock saxophonists
American keyboardists
African-American rock musicians
Musicians from Omaha, Nebraska
People from Omaha, Nebraska
American session musicians
20th-century American male musicians
21st-century American male musicians
20th-century African-American musicians
21st-century African-American musicians